Tom Holland Chester (7 November 1907 – 1979) was a Scottish professional association footballer who played as a full back.

External links

1907 births
1979 deaths
Footballers from Glasgow
Scottish footballers
Association football fullbacks
Bury F.C. players
Burnley F.C. players
Notts County F.C. players
Rochdale A.F.C. wartime guest players
English Football League players